Immunoglobulin class switching, also known as isotype switching, isotypic commutation or class-switch recombination (CSR), is a biological mechanism that changes a B cell's production of immunoglobulin from one type to another, such as from the isotype IgM to the isotype IgG. During this process, the constant-region portion of the antibody heavy chain is changed, but the variable region of the heavy chain stays the same (the terms variable and constant refer to changes or lack thereof between antibodies that target different epitopes). Since the variable region does not change, class switching does not affect antigen specificity. Instead, the antibody retains affinity for the same antigens, but can interact with different effector molecules.

Mechanism 

Class switching occurs after activation of a mature B cell via its membrane-bound antibody molecule (or B cell receptor) to generate the different classes of antibody, all with the same variable domains as the original antibody generated in the immature B cell during the process of V(D)J recombination, but possessing distinct constant domains in their heavy chains.

Naïve mature B cells produce both IgM and IgD, which are the first two heavy chain segments in the immunoglobulin locus. After activation by antigen, these B cells proliferate. If these activated B cells encounter specific signaling molecules via their CD40 and cytokine receptors (both modulated by T helper cells), they undergo antibody class switching to produce IgG, IgA or IgE antibodies. During class switching, the constant region of the immunoglobulin heavy chain changes but the variable regions do not, and therefore antigenic specificity, remains the same.  This allows different daughter cells from the same activated B cell to produce antibodies of different isotypes or subtypes (e.g. IgG1, IgG2 etc.).

In humans, the order of the heavy chain exons is as follows:

 μ - IgM
 δ - IgD
 γ3 - IgG3
 γ1 - IgG1
 α1 - IgA1
 γ2 - IgG2
 γ4 - IgG4
 ε - IgE
 α2 - IgA2

Class switching occurs by a mechanism called class switch recombination (CSR) binding. Class switch recombination is a biological mechanism that allows the class of antibody produced by an activated B cell to change during a process known as isotype or class switching.  During CSR, portions of the antibody heavy chain locus are removed from the chromosome, and the gene segments surrounding the deleted portion are rejoined to retain a functional antibody gene that produces antibody of a different isotype. Double-stranded breaks are generated in DNA at conserved nucleotide motifs, called switch (S) regions, which are upstream from gene segments that encode the constant regions of antibody heavy chains; these occur adjacent to all heavy chain constant region genes with the exception of the δ-chain. DNA is nicked and broken at two selected S-regions by the activity of a series of enzymes, including activation-induced (cytidine) deaminase (AID), uracil DNA glycosylase and apyrimidic/apurinic (AP)-endonucleases. The intervening DNA between the S-regions is subsequently deleted from the chromosome, removing unwanted μ or δ heavy chain constant region exons and allowing substitution of a γ, α or ε constant region gene segment. The free ends of the DNA are rejoined by a process called non-homologous end joining (NHEJ) to link the variable domain exon to the desired downstream constant domain exon of the antibody heavy chain. In the absence of non-homologous end joining, free ends of DNA may be rejoined by an alternative pathway biased toward microhomology joins.  With the exception of the μ and δ genes, only one antibody class is expressed by a B cell at any point in time.
While class switch recombination is mostly a deletional process, rearranging a chromosome in "cis", it can also occur (in 10 to 20% of cases, depending upon the Ig class) as an inter-chromosomal translocation mixing immunoglobulin heavy chain genes from both alleles.

Cytokines responsible for class switching 
T cell cytokines modulate class switching in mouse (Table 1) and human (Table 2). These cytokines may have suppressive effect on production of IgM.

Gene regulatory sequences responsible for class switching 
In addition to the highly repetitive structure of the target S regions, the process of class switching needs S regions to be first transcribed and spliced out of the immunoglobulin heavy chain transcripts (where they lie within introns). Chromatin remodeling, accessibility to transcription and to AID and synapsis of broken S regions are under the control of a large super-enhancer, located downstream the more distal Calpha gene, the 3' regulatory region (3'RR). In some occasions, the 3'RR super-enhancer can itself be targeted by AID and undergo DNA breaks and junction with Sμ, which then deletes the Ig heavy chain locus and defines locus suicide recombination (LSR).

See also 
 Antibody
 Genetic recombination
 Immune checkpoint
 Immunogenetics

References

External links 

 

Immune system
Biological processes
Immune system process
Immunology